Proto-oncogene Wnt-1, or  Proto-oncogene Int-1 homolog is a protein that in humans is encoded by the  gene.

The WNT gene family consists of structurally related genes that encode secreted signaling proteins. These proteins have been implicated in oncogenesis and in several developmental processes, including regulation of cell fate and patterning during embryogenesis. This gene is a member of the WNT gene family. It is very conserved in evolution, and the protein encoded by this gene is known to be 98% identical to the mouse Wnt1 protein at the amino acid level. The studies in mouse indicate that the Wnt1 protein functions in the induction of the mesencephalon and cerebellum. This gene was originally considered as a candidate gene for Joubert syndrome, an autosomal recessive disorder with cerebellar hypoplasia as a leading feature. However,  further studies suggested that the gene mutations might not have a significant role in Joubert syndrome. This gene is clustered with another family member, WNT10B, in the chromosome 12q13 region.

See also 
 Wnt signaling pathway

References

Further reading